Ḥarrat Kishb is a lava field 5,892 km2 in area, located in western Saudi Arabia. It is near the Al Wahbah Crater.

See also

 List of volcanoes in Saudi Arabia
 Sarat Mountains
 Hijaz Mountains

References

External links
 Geological Society of America Bulletin

Volcanoes of Saudi Arabia
Lava fields
Hejaz